GHETTO RUFF is an independent South African recording label specializing in kwaito, hip hop, soul, house, gospel and rhythm and blues.  Having been formed around the need to have a voice against apartheid GR released Prophets of da City who had tracks banned by the government of the day.

Currently, Ghetto Ruff Records known as Mlominent artists including Prophets of Da City (POC), Ishmael, Skeem, OdaMeesta, ASHAAN, Brickz, Zola, Pitch Black Afro, DJ Cleo, Bravo, Brown Dash, Mzekezeke, DJ What What, Skomplazi, Amu, Brassie Vannie Kaap, Tuks, Morafe, Jozi, Da Les, Bongani Fassie, Vusi NOVA, Nathi, NANCY G, BISHOP LOUIS, RUFF X, RJ Bejamin, Drenko, Kyllex, Malik, MCHANGANI, Gumshev, Metswako, Slice, SpyKos were just some of the releases.

History
Ghetto Ruff came to be in the late 1980s when Lance Stehr (current Managing Director of the label) formed the Cape Town-based hip hop group, Prophets of Da City. POC did extremely well in South Africa as well as internationally.  In many ways POC enabled Stehr to expand and grow the label into the premiere kwaito label in South Africa today.  South Africa's R&B star Ishmael was born out of POC and in 1996 he helped Ghetto Ruff Records enter the kwaito genre when the group Skeem was formed, another splinter group of POC was the acclaimed Afrikaans hip hop group Brasse Vannie Kaap.  With this foundation, Stehr was able to discover and nurture most probably the most artists from an independent label resulting in hundreds of thousands of record sales over the year.

Stehr also produced the sound track for YIZO YIZO, TSOTSI (OSCAR WINNER), and went on to TV to do JOZI - MOVING THE CITY, FLY CHIX and SKYROOM LIVE.

Artists
Kaybee (legendary music producer/artist)
Amu (rapper)
Bishop Louis
Bongani Fassie
Bravo 
Zola
Brickz
BVK : Brasse Vannie Kaap
DJ Cleo
Drencko
FIESTA BLACK
Gumshev
Ishmael
Jozi
Kyllex
Malik
Mchangani
Metswako
Mgarimbe
Morafe
NATHI
POC : Prophets Of Da City
RJ Benjamin
RUFF X
Skomplazi
Spykos
Slice
Vusi Nova
Tuks 
Zola
37MPH aka Mpho Pholo (Music Producer/Artist)
D Low
Skeem
Cream
Ashaan
Ghetto Luv
O Da Meesta
Boomaratcy 
DJs Revolution
DJ Killa and DJ Murder
DJ What What 
Mapaputsi
Tandoor
Ms Mash
Kofifi
Mavusana & Mizchif
Jobe
Jabu (The Weatherman)
Jay ( Gospel) 
Nontende
Ntjapedi
Pitch Black Afro (PBA)
Dj Mthakathi
Mzekezeke
Brown Dash
Unathi Msengana ( Idols Judge)
Jub Jub 
Shluda
DJ Nkoh
Keith Murray ( US Rapper)
Puff Johnson ( US Artist)
da L.E.S
Cooke
Maggz
Ricky Rick
Mzansi Strings
Fly Chix 
Nancy G
Veezo 
Wanda
Dj Sneja
Vusi Nova
Chanel
Moneoa
ShoutOut
Makizar
Tarajika
Young & Dirty
Joelle Xo
Nasrene
Amanda Mankayi 
Bongani Radebe 
Ntando
Mega Drum
Sho Madjozi
PS Djz
Bekazela
Dear Zwicky
Dj Vitoto
Skara Teka
Hush-SA
047
Onesimus
Ntsika
Ntando

See also
 List of record labels

References

South African independent record labels